Joël Bossis (born 20 May 1965) is a French former professional association footballer who played as a striker.

Career
During his career, Bossis played for five different clubs, making almost 500 league appearances and scoring well over 100 goals. With a total of 51 goals in over 200 league matches for the club, he was Chamois Niortais' top ever goal scorer during their professional period between 1985 and 2009.

Personal life
Joël is the brother of the French former international footballer, Maxime Bossis.

References

External links
Joël Bossis profile at chamoisfc79.fr

1965 births
Living people
French footballers
Association football defenders
La Roche VF players
Le Mans FC players
FC Martigues players
LB Châteauroux players
Chamois Niortais F.C. players
Ligue 1 players
Ligue 2 players